The National Theatre (1911-1978) of Boston, Massachusetts, was a 3,500-seat multipurpose auditorium on Tremont Street in the South End. It functioned as a cinema, lecture hall, and stage. Performers included Jehovah's Witness founder Joseph F. Rutherford and "big-name entertainers like Duke Ellington and Ray Bolger." Movie screenings included The Battle of Gettysburg in 1913. The English High School held graduation exercises in the National. Around 1919 it was known as the "Waldorf Theater." In 1992, it was purchased by Philip Smith. 

The space operated "intermittently after World War II for plays and movies." Among the audience members: clothing designer Joseph Abboud. The National closed in 1978. The Boston Center for the Arts oversaw the property thereafter, when it was subject to numerous plans for redevelopment. The building existed until 1997, when it was demolished.

Images

References

External links

 Bostonian Society:
 Photo of National Theatre at 535 Tremont Street, 1931
 Photo of 535 Tremont Street, ca. 1946

South End, Boston
Demolished buildings and structures in Boston
1911 establishments in Massachusetts
1978 disestablishments in Massachusetts
Cultural history of Boston
20th century in Boston
Former cinemas in the United States
Former theatres in Boston
Event venues established in 1911
Buildings and structures demolished in 1997